This is a list of prime ministers of the United Kingdom by length of tenure. This is based on the difference between dates; if counted by number of calendar days, figures would be one day greater for each term served.

The term "Prime Minister" appeared in the early eighteenth century, as an unofficial title for the leader of the government, usually the head of the Treasury. Jonathan Swift, for example, wrote that in 1713 there had been "those who are now commonly called Prime Minister among us", referring to Sidney Godolphin and Robert Harley, Queen Anne's Lord Treasurers and chief ministers. Robert Walpole is regarded as the first prime minister; he became First Lord of the Treasury of Great Britain in 1721. This list includes all Prime Ministers of the Kingdom of Great Britain, United Kingdom of Great Britain and Ireland and the modern-day United Kingdom of Great Britain and Northern Ireland.

Notable lengths

Of the 56 past prime ministers, nine served more than 10 years while eight served less than a year. Robert Walpole is the only person to have served as prime minister for more than two decades. Liz Truss is the shortest-serving former prime minister, resigning after seven weeks. The previous shortest time served was George Canning, who served for less than four months before dying in office. Margaret Thatcher is the longest serving prime minister in modern history, serving for over 11 years. William Gladstone is the only person to have served four separate terms.

List of office holders by tenure
Note In this table, "Terms" is the number of separate periods served as prime minister.

Disputed

See also
 History of the prime minister of the United Kingdom
 List of leaders of the opposition of the United Kingdom by length of tenure
 List of prime ministers of the United Kingdom
 List of prime ministers of the United Kingdom by age
 List of prime ministers of Australia by time in office
 List of prime ministers of Canada by time in office
 List of prime ministers of New Zealand by time in office

References

United Kingdom
Time in office